Asterix & Obelix XXL 2: Mission: Las Vegum is an action-adventure game for Windows and PlayStation 2, the sequel to Asterix & Obelix XXL. It was released in June 2006 in Europe. The game stars the French comic book characters Asterix and Obelix, and features spoofs to many classic games, in the same fashion that the comics spoof historical characters and make many cultural references. One such example of this is the box art that has a passing resemblance to the one seen in Grand Theft Auto: San Andreas.

A remake called Asterix & Obelix XXL 2: Mission: Wifix was released for the Nintendo DS and PlayStation Portable in 2006.

Story
Julius Caesar, in another plan to conquer Gaul, builds a theme park called Las Vegum, a parody of Las Vegas. Getafix swears loyalty to Caesar, and goes to Las Vegum. Asterix and Obelix come to his rescue, with the help of a Roman spy named Sam Shieffer, a reference to Sam Fisher from the Ubisoft Splinter Cell series.

Las Vegum is divided in 6 zones: Lutetia, WCW, LuckSore (Luxor), Little Venetia (parody of Venice), Pirate Island, and SeizeUs Palace. Throughout the game, Romans who slightly resemble famous video game heroes Mario (Nintendo), Sonic the Hedgehog (Sega), Rayman (Ubisoft), Pac-Man (Namco) and Ryu (Capcom) appear as frequent enemies, while Lara Croft (Eidos Interactive), here a Roman centurion called Larry Craft, appears as a mini-boss. In addition, Caesar references The Matrix series by calling Asterix "Mr. Anderson".

Mission: Wifix

Asterix & Obelix XXL 2: Mission Wifix is a remake of Mission Las Vegum for the PlayStation Portable and the Nintendo DS. It revolves around the same plot, with added touch screen minigames and Wi-Fi multiplayer modes.

Gameplay
The PlayStation Portable game is a 3D platformer. It uses almost all of the same elements as the console version. The player can switch between Asterix and Obelix at any time and almost every room from the console version is recreated with its hundreds of parodies of many video game series. The Nintendo DS game is a 2D platformer where occasionally the player must complete touch-screen mini-games throughout the story which can also be played outside of the main adventure mode. Both versions also contain multiplayer modes, the PlayStation Portable allowing up to four players to play competitive games across a wide selection of arenas where one team works to accomplish an objective while the other has to prevent their progress, and the Nintendo DS allowing two players to compete on the touch-screen mini-games along with two additional multiplayer-only mini-games.

The game takes the player through such places like Little Paris, WCW, LuckSore, Little Venetia, Pirate Island, and even SeizeUs Palace with each room being created in great detail. The game was considered fun and interesting by users receiving a score of 87 from 47 user ratings on GameSpot.com

The main drawback noted by users was that the game could become repetitive after some time.

Remaster 
A high-definition remaster was announced on July 6, 2018 by Anuman under their Microids brand label and developed by OSome Studio. It was released on November 29, 2018 for PlayStation 4, Xbox One, Windows, macOS (through Steam and GOG.com) and Nintendo Switch. It was later released for PlayStation 5 on December 29, 2022. On PAL regions, it received a retail release in the form of both a Limited Edition and a Collector's Edition. It was also announced on the same day that a third installment, Asterix & Obelix XXL 3: The Crystal Menhir was in development.

A physical version was released in the United States in November 2019 through Maximum Games, under the name Roman Rumble in Las Vegum: Asterix & Obelix XXL 2, making it the first time the game has been officially released in North America.

References

External links
GameSpot Summary

2006 video games
Atari games
Action-adventure games
PlayStation 2 games
Nintendo Switch games
Microïds games
Windows games
Video game sequels
Video games based on Asterix
Video games set in the Roman Empire
Video games scored by Allister Brimble
Video games developed in France
Parody video games
PlayStation 4 games
MacOS games
PlayStation 5 games
Xbox One games
Depictions of Julius Caesar in video games
3D platform games
Single-player video games
Étranges Libellules games
OSome Studio games